This is a list of records and statistics in relation to the Italian football club Società Sportiva Lazio.

All time

Divisional movements

Total appearances
Statistics accurate as of 19 February 2023.

Total goals
Statistics accurate as of 19 February 2023.

Serie A record

Scudetti: 2
1973–74, 1999–2000

Total Serie A appearances
Statistics accurate as of 19 February 2023.

Total Serie A goals
Statistics accurate as of 19 February 2023.

European record

Statistics in European competitions 

UEFA Cup Winners' Cup: 1 
1998–99
UEFA Super Cup: 1 
1999
Coppa delle Alpi: 1 
1971

Total European appearances 

Statistics accurate as of 19 February 2023.

Total European goals
Statistics accurate as of 19 February 2023.

National Cup record

Coppa Italia: 7
1958, 1997–98, 1999–2000, 2003–04, 2008–09, 2012–13, 2018–19

Supercoppa Italiana: 5
1998, 2000, 2009, 2017, 2019

Total national cup appearances
Statistics accurate as of 22 May 2022 and include both Coppa Italia and Supercoppa Italiana matches.

Total national cup goals
Statistics accurate as of 22 May 2022 and include both Coppa Italia and Supercoppa Italiana goals.

Capocannonieri
List of Capocannonieri (Serie A top scorers).

Statistics accurate as of 22 May 2022.

Club records
Statistics accurate as of 1 August 2020.
 Largest victory:
 13–1 v Pro Roma, Prima Categoria, 10 November 1912.
 Largest defeat:
 1–8 v Internazionale, Serie A, 18 March 1934. 0–7 v Internazionale, Serie A, 5 March 1961.
 Most points in a season:
 78 (2019–20)
 Fewest points in a season:
 15 (1984–85)
 Most victories in a season:
 24 (2019–20)
 Fewest victories in a season:
 2 (1984–85)
 Most defeats in a season:
 21 (1960–61)
 Fewest defeats in a season:
 3 (1972–73)
 Most goals scored in a season:
 89 (2017–18)
 Fewest goals scored in a season:
 16 (1984–85)
 Most goals conceded in a season:
 66 (1933–34)
 Fewest goals conceded in a season:
 16 (1972–73)

References

Records
Lazio